Roman Kunyev (born September 20, 1990 in Kremenchuk, Poltava Oblast, Ukrainian SSR) is a Ukrainian defender who plays for FC Olimpiya Savyntsi.

Career 
Kunyev is the product of the Youth Sportive School FC Kremin Kremenchuk, but in January 2009 he signed a contract with FC Vorskla Poltava.

Sklyar's professional career continued, when he was promoted on loan again to FC Kremin Kremenchuk and in July 2012 signed a one-year contract. Half a year later, in January 2013 he again signed a contract with FC Vorskla.

References

External links 
Profile at Official Site FFU (Ukr)
Profile at Soccerway

Ukrainian footballers
FC Kremin Kremenchuk players
FC Vorskla Poltava players
FC Hirnyk-Sport Horishni Plavni players
Ukrainian Premier League players
Association football defenders
1990 births
Living people
Ukrainian First League players
People from Kremenchuk
Sportspeople from Poltava Oblast